Donavan may refer to:

Donavan Freberg (born 1971), American advertising creative, voice actor, photographer, and writer
Donavan Johnson (born 1985), American rapper, singer and songwriter
Donavan Mitchem (born 1989), American activist
Donavan Tate (born 1990), American minor league baseball player

See also
Donavon (disambiguation)
Donovan (disambiguation)